Williams Glacier is a  long glacier in the U.S. state of Alaska. The name was reported in 1908 by Grant and Higgins (1910, pl. 2), USGS. It was named for Williams College in  Williamstown, Massachusetts.

See also
 List of glaciers

References

Glaciers of Alaska
Glaciers of Chugach Census Area, Alaska
Glaciers of Unorganized Borough, Alaska